Hvepsen (Norwegian: "The Wasp") was a Norwegian humorous and satirical magazine which was in circulation between 1905 and 1926.

History and profile
Hvepsen was founded in 1905 by people involved in the labour movement in Kristiania, including John Johansen, Ole O. Lian, Marius Ormestad, Lyder Strøm and Hans Østerholt. Østerholt was the editor-in-chief from 1905 to 1925.

The frequency of the magazine changed three times. It was published monthly from its inception to 1908. Next it was published bimonthly from 1909 to 1912. Then it was a weekly until its disestablishment in 1926.

Illustrators for Hvepsen included Jens R. Nilssen and text contributors included Johan Falkberget. Falkberget's Bør Børson was first published as a feuilleton in Hvepsen.

The 1920 were tumultuous times. The Norwegian Labour Party saw two parties split away, and Hvepsen supported the new Social Democratic Labour Party of Norway. For this reason the magazine was evicted from Folkets Hus in 1922. It went defunct in 1926, and the publishing rights were held by Arbeidermagasinet until 1932.

References

1905 establishments in Norway
1926 disestablishments in Norway
Bi-monthly magazines published in Norway
Defunct magazines published in Norway
Magazines established in 1905
Magazines disestablished in 1926
Magazines published in Oslo
Monthly magazines published in Norway
Norwegian-language magazines
Satirical magazines published in Norway
Weekly magazines published in Norway